Ketlen Wiggers (born 7 January 1992), commonly known as Ketlen, is a Brazilian football forward who plays for Santos in Brazil and the Brazil women's national football team. Since playing for Vitória das Tabocas, she has sometimes worn the nickname "Barbie" on her shirt. Pernambuco residents thought her light skin, blue eyes and fair hair bore a resemblance to the fashion doll manufactured by Mattel.

Club career
In the 2013 Damallsvenskan season Ketlen played five times for Vittsjö. Ketlen transferred from Centro Olímpico to Boston Breakers in December 2014. After Ketlen played 61 minutes of one match, the Breakers agreed to release her from her contract due to homesickness.

Since leaving the Breakers in 2015, Ketlen has played for in Brazil for Santos FC in the Campeonato Brasileiro de Futebol Feminino.

International career
Ketlen's senior debut for Brazil came in October 2011, in a 2–0 Pan American Games win over Argentina at Estadio Omnilife in Guadalajara, Mexico.

Career statistics

International

References

External links
 
 
 Santos FC player profile

1992 births
Living people
Brazilian women's footballers
Brazil women's international footballers
Damallsvenskan players
Brazilian expatriate women's footballers
Expatriate women's footballers in Sweden
Expatriate women's soccer players in the United States
Vittsjö GIK players
Boston Breakers players
Associação Desportiva Centro Olímpico players
Santos FC (women) players
Brazilian expatriate sportspeople in the United States
National Women's Soccer League players
Women's association football forwards
Pan American Games medalists in football
Pan American Games silver medalists for Brazil
Footballers at the 2011 Pan American Games
Universiade bronze medalists for Brazil
Universiade medalists in football
Medalists at the 2011 Summer Universiade
Medalists at the 2011 Pan American Games
Campeonato Brasileiro de Futebol Feminino Série A1 players
Associação Acadêmica e Desportiva Vitória das Tabocas players
21st-century Brazilian women